Kiss the Bride is a 2002 romantic comedy film about an Italian family, directed by Vanessa Parise. The film takes place in Westerly, Rhode Island, the hometown of director/actor/writer/producer Parise.

Plot
The story centers around a traditional Italian-American family and four daughters each having completely different personalities. Danni, one of the sisters, is about to be the first of the sisters to walk down the aisle. That is, if her three sisters won't stop it. Niki, Chrissy and Toni return home for the long overdue family reunion, which ultimately turns into a contest of who can one-up the other. Niki brings her Jewish boyfriend along, the lesbian Toni is accompanied by her biker girlfriend Amy, and Chrissy, who is too busy for a boyfriend, brings her brand new Porsche. The sisters reek of overachievement and insecurity and subconsciously long for the approval and love of their domineering father.

Cast
Amanda Detmer as Danisa "Danni" Sposato
Alyssa Altman as Young Danni
Brooke Langton as Nikoleta "Niki" Sposato
Francesca Catalano as Young Niki
Monet Mazur as Antonia "Toni" Sposato
Vanessa Parise as Christina "Chrissy" Sposato
Sean Patrick Flanery as Tom Terranova
Johnathon Schaech as Geoffrey "Geoff" Brancato
Alyssa Milano as Amy Kayne
Johnny Whitworth as Marty Weinberg
Talia Shire as Irena Sposato
Burt Young as Santo Sposato

External links

Official site

2002 films
American romantic comedy films
2002 romantic comedy films
American LGBT-related films
Lesbian-related films
Films about weddings
Films set in Rhode Island
Metro-Goldwyn-Mayer direct-to-video films
Italian-American culture in Rhode Island
2002 directorial debut films
Films directed by Vanessa Parise
2000s English-language films
2000s American films
LGBT-related romantic comedy films